Tilston is a village and a civil parish in the county of Cheshire, England.

Tilston may also refer to:

 Tilston, Manitoba, Canada

People 
 Eynion de Tilston (born c. 1126), Norman knight and first lord of the manor of Tilston, Cheshire
 Frederick Albert Tilston (1906–1992), Canadian World War II recipient of the Victoria Cross
 Martha Tilston (born 1975/1976), English folk-based singer-songwriter
 Steve Tilston (born 1950), English folk singer-songwriter and guitarist
 Tommy Tilston (1926–1997), English footballer
 Will Tilston (born 2007), English actor

See also
 Tilton (disambiguation)